Juan Carlos Arias Acosta (born December 3, 1964) a.k.a "Machete" is a two-time Olympian cyclist from Pereira, Colombia. Juan Carlos is a Pan American Champion, who has raced in the Tour de France, Giro d'Italia, and the Road World Championship, among many other major racing events. Juan Carlos Arias is the only Colombian athlete to date to represent the country in two different sports in the Olympics. Juan Carlos Arias has been riding since 1982 out of Colombia S.A. and currently resides in Atlanta, Georgia with his family and children. Prior to becoming a professional cyclist, Juan Carlos Arias played soccer for Maracaneiro Football Club in Bogotá, Colombia.

Teams

Accolades
 1984 - Road Champion Colombia 
 1985 - Champion Trinidad & Togabo Classic 
 1987 - Pan-American Games Route Champion
 1987 - Champion Tour of Guadeloupe, France
 1987 - Sub-Champion Giro de Veneto, Italy
 1987 - Vuelta de Malaga, Spain, Sub-Champion (Ganador de Etapa y de la Montaña) 
 1988 - 31st in Olympic Games, Road, Amateurs, Tongillo Road, Seoul 
 1991 - National Championship, Road, Elite, Colombia 
 1996 - Placed 34 in Olympic Games in Atlanta, United States
 2015 - Champion Georgia State Road Race, United States
 2017 - Sub Champion Grand Fondo, New York, United States
 2017 - Champion Georgia State Road Race, United States

Achievements

 1984 – Departmental Champion Cundinamarca
 1985 – Champion Tour Trinidad & Tobago
 1986 – Colombian National Route Champion
 1986 – Placed 27 in Colorado Spring Route World Championship
 1987 – Pan-American Route Champion
 1987 – Second place in Giro de Venneto – Italy- winner of one stage and of the mountain
 1987 – Winner of the Regularity, winner of one stage and sub-champion of the Tour of Malaga in Spain
 1987 – Champion of the Tour of Guadalupe
 1987 – Champion of the regularity and of the bonus sprint in the Tour of Colombia
 1987 – Sub-champion of the bonus sprint in classic RCN
 1987 – Placed 17 in the world championship of the route in Austria
 1988 – Placed 31 in the Olympic Games in Seoul – Korea  
 1988 – Sub-champion of the Tour de Malaga in Spain
 1988 – National route Sub-Champion of Colombia
 1989 – Placed 41 in Tour de Spain
 1989 – Placed 71 Giro de Italy
 1989 – Placed 17 and sub-champion of the mountain of the week in Catalana in Spain
 1989 – champion of the "Clasica Roldanillo" – Colombia
 1990 – Participation Tour de Spain
 1990 – Participation Giro de Italy
 1990 – Placed 16 in the race "Paris NLZA" in France
 1990 – Champion of the regularity and of the bonus sprint in the Tour of Colombia
 1990 – Champion of the bonus sprint in "El Classico RCN" and subchampion of the regularity in Colombia
 1991 – Participation in the Giro de Italy
 1991 – Sub-champion Profesional of route
 1991 – Champion of the regularity and winner of two stages in LAS "Clasicas de Boyaca and Cundinmarca"
 1991 – Placed 21 in the "Tour do Portugal"
 1992 – Sub-champion of the regularity in the Tour a Colombia and ninth place in the general
 1993 – Sub-champion of Yardley Gold of mountain biking and winner of 1 Valida
 1994 – Champion national of mountain biking, winner of 3 Validas of the championship and champion of the Yardley Gold tournament
 1994 – Placed 41 in the world championship of mountain biking in Colorado (US), best Colombian
 1995 – Third in the national championship of mountain biking and sub-champion of the Yardley Gold tournament
 1995 – Placed 71 in the world championship and best Colombian
 1995 – Placed 10 in the Latin-American championship of mountain biking in Cordoba (Argentina)
 1995 – Champion of the rally totoritas in Lima (Peru) of mountain biking
 1996 – National champion of mountain biking in "Producciones Tournament" world championship of mountain biking, winner of 3 stages
 1996 – Placed 34 in Olympic Games in Atlanta US
 1996 – Fourth place in "Bolivarianos of Quito" Ecuador
 1996 – Subchampion of the "Rally Totoritas in Lima" – Peru
 1997 – Fourth place in the Pan-American Championship in Santiago de Chile
 1997 – Subchampion Latin American mountain biking
 1997 – National subchampion of mountain biking cross-country – Colombia
 1997 – Winner of 3 stages of the national championship and 4 place in championship
 1997 – Champion of the "Rally de Totoritas in Lima"- Peru
 1997 – Champion of one "Valida Copa Norva" in U.S.
 1997 – Second place "Valida Copa Norva" IN U.S.
 1997 – Placed 30 in "Parada de Copa" of the world U.S.
 1998 – Subchampion of the super mountain bike in Chile
 1998 – Subchampion tour of "Volcan Villa Rica" – Chile
 1998 – Second in championship national cross country of mountain biking for stages – Colombia
 1998 – 10th place in Pan-American Toluca - Mexico
 1998 – 3 place in Rally Totoritas - Peru
 2000 – 5 place in Championship Pan-American in Puerto Rico
 2000 – 3 place in Championship National per stage cross country - Colombia
 2015 - Champion Georgia State Road Race, United States
 2017 - Sub Champion Grand Fondo, New York, United States
 2017 - Champion Georgia State Road Race, United States

References

External links
 Lifetime Bikes
 Facebook
 The-Sport.ORG
 Cycling Ranking
  World Tour

1964 births
Colombian male cyclists
Living people
People from Risaralda Department
Olympic cyclists of Colombia
Cyclists at the 1988 Summer Olympics